Helfert is a surname. Notable people with the surname include:

Michael Helfert, American scientist
Vladimír Helfert (1886–1945), Czech musicologist

See also
Helfer (surname)